David Adams and Andrei Olhovskiy were the defending champions but did not compete that year.

Jean-Philippe Fleurian and Guillaume Raoux won in the final 6–3, 6–2 against Marius Barnard and Peter Nyborg.

Seeds

Draw

External links
 Main Draw on ATP Archive

Open 13
1996 ATP Tour